De Korenbloem is a name given to some windmills in Belgium and the Netherlands.

De Korenbloem, Culemborg, a windmill in Gelderland
De Korenbloem, Goes, a windmill in Zeeland
De Korenbloem, Haaksbergen, a windmill in Overijssel
De Korenbloem, Loil, a windmill in Gelderland
De Korenbloem, Mill, a windmill in North Brabant
De Korenbloem, Oploo, a windmill in North Brabant
De Korenbloem, Ospel, a windmill in Limburg, Netherlands
De Korenbloem, Oude-Tonge, a windmill in South Holland
De Korenbloem, Scherpenisse, a windmill in Zeeland
De Korenbloem, Sommelsdijk, a windmill in South Holland
De Korenbloem, Ulvenhout, a windmill in North Brabant
De Korenbloem, Vriescheloo, a windmill in Groningen
De Korenbloem, Zoelen, a windmill in Gelderland
De Korenbloem, Zonnemaire, a windmill in Zeeland
De Drie Korenblomen, Schiedam, a windmill in South Holland
Korenbloem, Ophoven, a windmill in Limburg, Belgium